Chongde Qaghan or Küçlüg Bilge Qaghan was the ninth ruler of Uyghurs. His personal name is not known, therefore he is often referred as his Tang dynasty invested title Chongde (Chinese: 崇德可汗; literally: 'Honoring virtue') which was invested on 26 May 821.

Reign 
Upon his accession, he sent a delegation including a number of officials and two Uyghur princesses, along with a bride price of horses and camels to Muzong in order to seek a Tang Princess. Muzong agreed and sent Princess Taihe with a grand delegation. She was escorted by the general Hu Zheng (胡証), assisted by the other officials Li Xian (李憲) and Yin You (殷侑). They did not arrive at Uyghur capital until 822. Princess Taihe was later created Renxiao Duanli Mingzhi Shangshou Khatun (人小椴黎明之上首可敦) by Muzong.

He was visited by Muslim traveller Tamim ibn Bahr after his marriage. According to Tamim's notes, he had a personal army of 12000 with 17 subordinates each having 13000 soldiers.

He died in 824 and was succeeded by his brother Zhaoli Qaghan.

Family 
He had at least 5 sons:

 Zhangxin Qaghan
 Womosi Tegin (submitted to Tang China)
 Alizhi (阿歷支) (submitted to Tang China)
 Xiwuchuo (習勿啜) (submitted to Tang China)
 Wuluosi (烏羅思) (submitted to Tang China)

References 

824 deaths
9th-century monarchs in Asia
9th-century Turkic people
Ädiz clan